Frederick Willis may refer to:

 Frederick Willis (American politician) (1904–1971), American politician in the Massachusetts House of Representatives
 Frederick Willis (rugby league), Welsh rugby league footballer of the 1920s
 Frederick Willis (British Army officer) (1823–1899), British Army general
 Frederick Smythe Willis (1866–1910), British-born Australian municipal official; mayor of Willoughby, New South Wales
 Frederick Willis (civil servant) (1863–1946), English lawyer and civil servant
 Fred Willis (born 1947), American football running back
 Fred Willis (communist) (1873–1947), English communist activist